Ural is a rural locality (a village) in Karlamansky Selsoviet, Karmaskalinsky District, Bashkortostan, Russia. The population was 325 as of 2010. There are 4 streets.

Geography 
Ural is located 8 km northeast of Karmaskaly, the district's administrative centre, by road. Alexeyevka is the nearest rural locality.

References 

Rural localities in Karmaskalinsky District